Wraysbury Skiff and Punting Club (WSPC) is an English skiff and punting club founded in 1931 based on the River Thames at the start of the Surrey section of the right bank – between the rest of Runnymede (the meadow in the borough of the same name) and Bell Weir Lock (founded as Egham Lock).

Boats, training and racing
The club hosts boats for two traditional water sports - Skiffing and Punting. Skiffs are traditional, stable wooden boats which are sculled with a pair of blades (oars). Punts are 2 ft and 1 ft (-beam) racing punts. Skiffs are raced at skiff regattas run under the rules of the Skiff Racing Association, and are used for leisure outings such as Thames meanders. Punting is carried out competitively (usually at the same regattas) under the rules of the Thames Punting Club. 

The club provides support and coaching for all levels from beginner to advanced. WSPC organises a club regatta in September, Wraysbury and Old Windsor Regatta and the Wraysbury Long Distance event in May. WSPC also hosts Egham Regatta, the last rowing regatta on the River Thames before Henley Royal Regatta.

The club has also incorporated dragon boat racing into its activities. The club colours are blue, green and white.

History
The club was founded by a group of keen river sports enthusiasts from Wraysbury, but as they were unable to find suitable accommodation on the Wraysbury side of the river, the first clubhouse was at Haines Boatyard in Old Windsor. 

The club later moved to accommodation next to Runnymede Pleasure Grounds, and has recently built a new club house there which was opened in October 2006.

Dragon boating
The Wraysbury Dragon Boat Club (now Wraysbury Dragons), an integral part of WSPC trains from these premises on Thursday evenings and Sunday mornings. Presently it has an affiliation with Bristol Empire Dragons and competes in the British Dragon Boat Racing Association (BDA) National league as Tao Dragons. Wraysbury Dragons has fielded a number of international Dragon boaters in all age classes from Juniors to "Grand Dragons" (50+). WSPC is a training base for the GB Grand Dragons and is also used by Junior teams. The youngest international thus far was 12 years old and the oldest over 60.

References

External links
 Wraysbury Skiff and Punting Club
 The Skiff Racing Association

Sports clubs established in 1931
Rowing clubs of the River Thames
Sport in Surrey
Rowing in Berkshire
Organisations based in Surrey